Blepharodes candelarius is a species of mantis in the genus Blepharodes in the order Mantodea.

See also
List of mantis genera and species

References

candelarius
Insects described in 1890